LBP-1 is a drug originally developed by Organon for the treatment of neuropathic pain, It acts as a potent and selective cannabinoid receptor agonist, with high potency at both the CB1 and CB2 receptors, but low penetration of the blood–brain barrier. This makes LBP-1 peripherally selective, and while it was effective in animal models of neuropathic pain and allodynia, it did not produce cannabinoid-appropriate responding suggestive of central effects, at any dose tested.

See also 
 Org 28312
 Org 28611
 PTI-1
 PTI-2

References 

Cannabinoids
Indoles
Piperazines
Peripherally selective drugs